Benbow is a census-designated place in Humboldt County, California, located beside the South Fork Eel River. Its population is 422 as of the 2020 census, up from 321 from the 2010 census.

History
The Children of Arthur Benbow purchased 1,288 acres from Ernest Linser and also some land from John Kamper, Jack Bowden and a Mr. Peirce in 1922. It soon became apparent that ranching would not be sufficient to meet their needs so the family decided to construct the resort hotel that still stands today. The children were Joseph, Evangeline, Burtis, Clara, Helen, Jessie, Loleta, Walter and Robert. Eight of these children were born in Humboldt County. In the early years the Inn was known as the "Hotel Benbow." It opened on July 17, 1926. The electricity for the hotel came from two diesel generators until a dam and powerhouse was completed on the south fork of the Eel River. The post office was established on December 30, 1929 and operated at Benbow from until it was merged with Garberville  on January 31, 1953. The Tudorbethan  style inn is still in operation as the premier hotel property on US Route 101 between Humboldt Bay and the San Francisco Bay Area.

Demographics

The 2010 United States Census reported that Benbow had a population of 321. The racial makeup of Benbow was 294 (91.6%) White, 0 (0.0%) African American, 2 (0.6%) Native American, 1 (0.3%) Asian, 0 (0.0%) Pacific Islander, 13 (4.0%) from other races, and 11 (3.4%) from two or more races. Hispanic or Latino of any race were 25 persons (7.8%).

The Census reported that 319 people (99.4% of the population) lived in households, 2 (0.6%) lived in non-institutionalized group quarters, and 0 (0%) were institutionalized.

There were 150 households, out of which 39 (26.0%) had children under the age of 18 living in them, 60 (40.0%) were opposite-sex married couples living together, 17 (11.3%) had a female householder with no husband present, 9 (6.0%) had a male householder with no wife present.  There were 16 (10.7%) unmarried opposite-sex partnerships, and 0 (0%) same-sex married couples or partnerships. 51 households (34.0%) were made up of individuals, and 13 (8.7%) had someone living alone who was 65 years of age or older. The average household size was 2.13.  There were 86 families (57.3% of all households); the average family size was 2.55.

The population was spread out, with 59 people (18.4%) under the age of 18, 19 people (5.9%) aged 18 to 24, 79 people (24.6%) aged 25 to 44, 108 people (33.6%) aged 45 to 64, and 56 people (17.4%) who were 65 years of age or older.  The median age was 46.2 years. For every 100 females, there were 101.9 males.  For every 100 females age 18 and over, there were 103.1 males.

The homeowner vacancy rate was 2.4%; the rental vacancy rate was 0%.  257 people (80.1% of the population) lived in owner-occupied housing units and 62 people (19.3%) lived in rental housing units.

Government

State and federal 

References

Census-designated places in Humboldt County, California
Populated places established in 1926
Census-designated places in California